The European Payments Union (EPU) was an organization in existence from July 1950 to December 1958, when it was replaced by the European Monetary Agreement.

With the end of World War II, economic depression struck Europe. Of all the non-neutral powers, only the GDP of the United Kingdom had not decreased because of the war, West Germany's GDP was at its 1908 level and France's at its 1891 level. Trade was based on  US dollar reserves (the only acceptable reserve currency), which Europe lacked.  Therefore, the transfer of money (immediately after each transaction) increased the opportunity cost of trading. Some trade was reduced to barter. The situation led the Organisation for European Economic Co-operation (OEEC) to create the EPU, all members signing the agreement on 1 July 1950. The EPU accounted for trades but did not transfer money until the end of the month.  It changed the landscape from bilateral trades of necessity (trading with partners because of outstanding debts) to multilateral trades. The EPU also forced liberalization by mandating that members eliminate discriminatory trade measures. The EPU was a general success with trade levels more than doubling during its existence. By its close in 1958, convertibility of currency was a possibility, no longer needing government permissions in European countries.

See also
 European Unit of Account
 Bretton Woods system 
 Marshall Plan
 Asian Clearing Union
 European Payments Council
 European System of Central Banks
 International Clearing Union

References 
 Baldwin, Richard and Charles Wyplosz. The Economics of European Integration.  McGraw-Hill, London: 2004.  
 Eichengreen, Barry. Reconstructing Europe's Trade and Payments The European Payments Union. Manchester University Press, 1993.
 EPU/EMA.  European University Institute. 
 Kaplan, Jacob J., and Gunther Schleiminger. 1989. European Payments Union: Financial Diplomacy in the 1950s. Oxford: Clarendon Press.

History of international trade
International trade organizations
Pan-European trade and professional organizations
Trade blocs
Euro